James E. Randlett (5 September 1846 – 1909) was an American architect from Concord, New Hampshire.

Life
Randlett was born in Quincy, Massachusetts, in 1846.  As a young child, his family moved to Gilmanton, New Hampshire.  As a teenager he enlisted in the Union Army as a drummer boy, serving for three years.  At the war's end he went to Concord, where he learned the carpenter's trade.  During the 1880s he became the keeper of the New Hampshire State House, at which position he remained for four years. In 1890, he became the partner of noted local architect Edward Dow, as Dow & Randlett. Their partnership lasted until Dow's death in 1894.

Randlett was briefly associated with George B. Howe as Randlett & Howe, but was soon practicing independently. In 1903 he partnered with George W. Griffin (1873-1957). Their partnership, Randlett & Griffin, survived until Randlett drowned in Lake Winnipesaukee in 1909.

Griffin continued the practice under his own name until shortly before his death.

Architectural works

Dow & Randlett, 1890-1894
 Bristol Savings Bank Building, 10 N. Main St., Bristol, New Hampshire (1892–93)
 Conant Hall, University of New Hampshire, Durham, New Hampshire (1892)
 Epping Town Hall, 157 Main St., Epping, New Hampshire (1892–93)
 Thompson Hall, University of New Hampshire, Durham, New Hampshire (1892)
 Antrim Town Hall, 66 Main St., Antrim, New Hampshire (1893–94)
 Phenix Hall, 40 N. Main St., Concord, New Hampshire (1893)
 Pleasant View (Mary Baker Eddy House), 227 Pleasant St., Concord, New Hampshire (1893) - Demolished.
 Y. M. C. A. Building, 12 N. State St., Concord, New Hampshire (1894)

James E. Randlett, c.1895-1903
 Dewey School, 38 Liberty St., Concord, New Hampshire (1900–01)
 Rumford School, 40 Thorndike St., Concord, New Hampshire (1901)
 Morrill Hall, University of New Hampshire, Durham, New Hampshire (1902)
 Woodstock High School, 15 South St., Woodstock, Vermont (1903) - Demolished.

Randlett & Griffin, 1903-1909
 Dover Public Library, 73 Locust St., Dover, New Hampshire (1903–04)
 Henry C. Whipple House, 75 Summer St., Bristol, New Hampshire (1904)
 Rochester Public Library, 65 S. Main St., Rochester, New Hampshire (1904–05)
 Garrison School, 17 Knight St., West Concord, New Hampshire (1905–06)
 New Hampshire Hall, University of New Hampshire, Durham, New Hampshire (1905) - Altered.

George W. Griffin, after 1909
 Hattie Tuttle Folsom Memorial School, 41 Main St., Pittsfield, New Hampshire (1910)
 Lane Memorial Library, 65 S. Main St., Hampton, New Hampshire (1910)
 Hayes Building, 14-44 Granite St., Haverhill, Massachusetts (1911)
 Monitor & Statesman Building, 10 Pleasant St., Concord, New Hampshire (1912)

Gallery

References

1846 births
1909 deaths
Architects from Massachusetts
Architects from New Hampshire
19th-century American architects
20th-century American architects
People from Quincy, Massachusetts
People from Concord, New Hampshire
People from Gilmanton, New Hampshire
Deaths by drowning in the United States